The Jamaica North Trail is a 6.5-mile-long (10.5 km) pedestrian and cycling trail running through southwest Lincoln, Nebraska, USA.

Description 
According to an October 2003 press release, the city of Lincoln purchased an  railway segment for $605,000.  Construction began in May 2006, the groundbreaking ceremony took place in mid-June 2006, and the trail itself was slated to open in late October 2006.

The Jamaica North trail connects to the Homestead Trail, which will ultimately extend  from Lincoln's Haymarket District to Marysville, Kansas.

The trail's surface is composed of crushed limestone and asphalt.

The Jamaica North Trail follows the path of an abandoned Union Pacific Railroad segment which ran through the historic town of Jamaica, Nebraska, near Saltillo Road.

See also 
 MoPac Trail
 Wilderness Park
 Rails-to-Trails Conservancy
 Union Pacific Railroad
 History of rail transport in the United States
 History of Lincoln, Nebraska
 Trails in Lincoln, Nebraska

References 

Rail trails in Nebraska
Geography of Lincoln, Nebraska
Union Pacific Railroad
Protected areas of Lancaster County, Nebraska
Tourist attractions in Lincoln, Nebraska